
Loke may refer to:

Surname
Luk or Loke is the Cantonese romanization of several (but not all) Chinese surnames that are romanized as Lu in Mandarin. It may refer to:

Lu (surname 陆)
Lu (surname 禄)
Lu (surname 逯)
Lu (surname 鹿)

Places
Loke, Krško, a settlement in Slovenia
Loke, Nova Gorica, a dispersed settlement in Slovenia
Loke, Straža, a settlement in Slovenia
Loke, Tabor, a dispersed settlement in Slovenia
Loke pri Mozirju, a settlement in Slovenia
Loke pri Planini, a settlement in Slovenia
Loke pri Zagorju, a settlement in Slovenia
Loke v Tuhinju, a village in Slovenia
Spodnje Loke, a settlement in Slovenia
Zgornje Loke, a settlement in Slovenia
Mount Loke, a mountain in Antarctica

Other uses
an alternative spelling of Loki, a god in Norse mythology
4862 Loke, an asteroid
HSwMS Loke, the name of several ships
Loke Viking, an anchor handling tug supply vessel
Ulmus × hollandica 'Loke', an elm cultivar

See also
Løke, a surname